Petr Musil (born 23 September 1981) is a Czech football midfielder. He made over 100 appearances in the Gambrinus liga. He also played international football at under-21 level for Czech Republic U21.

References

External links
 
 

1981 births
Living people
Czech footballers
Czech Republic youth international footballers
Czech Republic under-21 international footballers
Czech First League players
FC Zbrojovka Brno players
FK Jablonec players
FC Fastav Zlín players
Slovak Super Liga players
FK Inter Bratislava players

Association football midfielders